Jerry Estrin (May 6, 1947 – June 22, 1993) was a U.S. poet and magazine editor born in Los Angeles, California. Estrin was founder and editor of the magazines "Vanishing Cab" and "Art and Con".

Estrin received a B.A. in Russian History and Sociology from UCLA in the sixties, an M.A. in English from San Francisco State University in the seventies and an M.A. in Literacy Education from UC Berkeley in 1992. He was married to the poet Laura Moriarty.

Jerry Estrin died in his sleep on June 22, 1993. At the time of his death he was suffering from adrenal cancer. Prior to his death, Estrin organized a public reading of his book Rome, A Mobile Home. Scheduled for June 27, 1993 in Berkeley, California, the event became a group reading and memorial for Estrin instead.

Selected bibliography

A Book of Gestures (Somber Reptiles, 1980)
In Motion Speaking (Chance Additions, 1986)
Cold Heaven (Zasterle Press, 1990)
Rome, A Mobile Home (Roof Books, 1993)

External links
 from "Exorcise Your Monkey" excerpt from Estrin's "Exorcise Your Monkey" article from The Difficulties (Ron Silliman issue) 
Silliman's Blog: Thursday - December 29, 2005 U.S. poet Ron Silliman responds to the poetry and poetics of Estrin, one of his students at San Francisco State University.
Rome, A Mobile Home available here, complete and on-line in HTML document format

References

American magazine editors
1947 births
1993 deaths
Deaths from pancreatic cancer
Deaths from cancer in California
Writers from Los Angeles
University of California, Los Angeles alumni
San Francisco State University alumni
University of California, Berkeley alumni
20th-century American poets
20th-century American non-fiction writers